The 2007 Louisiana Tech Bulldogs football team represented Louisiana Tech University as a member of the Western Athletic Conference (WAC) during the 2007 NCAA Division I FBS football season. Led by first-year head coach Derek Dooley, the Bulldogs played their home games at Joe Aillet Stadium in Ruston, Louisiana. Dooley succeeded Jack Bicknell, Jr., who was fired after a 3–10 season in 2006. Louisiana Tech finished the season with a record of 5–7 overall and a mark of 4–4 in conference play, tying for fourth place in the WAC.

Before the season

T-Day spring game

Schedule

Coaching staff

Game summaries

Central Arkansas

Hawaii

California

Fresno State

Ole Miss

New Mexico State

Boise State

Utah State

Idaho

LSU

San Jose State

Nevada

References

Louisiana Tech
Louisiana Tech Bulldogs football seasons
Louisiana Tech Bulldogs football